Yponomeuta paurodes is a moth of the family Yponomeutidae. It is found in Australia in the states of Queensland and New South Wales.

The wingspan is about 20 mm.

The larvae feed on Cassine australis. They live solitarily in a small web on their food plant.

External links
Australian Faunal Directory
Australian Insects

Yponomeutidae
Moths described in 1907